Standing NATO Mine Countermeasures Group 1 (SNMCMG1) is a North Atlantic Treaty Organisation (NATO) standing mine countermeasures immediate reaction force. Its role is to provide NATO with an immediate operational response capability.

History
From its activation at Ostend on 11 May 1973, the unit was initially called Standing Naval Force Channel (STANAVFORCHAN).

STANAVFORCHAN and her sister force Mine Counter Measures Force Mediterranean (MCMFORMED) were tasked in June 1999 to operate in the Adriatic Sea to clear ordnance jettisoned during Operation Allied Force. The combined force comprised 11 minehunters and minesweepers and a support ship. The operation, named Allied Harvest, began on 9 June 1999. Search activities began three days later and lasted 73 days. In total, 93 pieces of ordnance were located and cleared in the nine areas which encompassed .

From 3 September 2001 it was known as the Mine Countermeasures Force North Western Europe (MCMFORNORTH) and from 1 January 2005 it became Standing NATO Mine Countermeasures Group 1.

Current ships

As of 24 February 2023, SNMCMG1 consists of:

  (Flagship) Nordkapp-class offshore patrol vessel, Nordkapp
  Frankenthal-class minehunter, Rottweil
  Sandown-class minehunter, Admiral Cowan
  Tripartite-class minehunter, Schiedam

See also
Standing NATO Mine Countermeasures Group 2
Standing NATO Maritime Group 1
Standing NATO Maritime Group 2

References

External links

Military units and formations of NATO